is a railway station in Seika, Kyoto, Japan. There is a transfer at this station to the nearby Komada Station on the Kintetsu Kyoto Line.

Lines
West Japan Railway Company (JR West)
Katamachi Line (Gakkentoshi Line)

Layout
The station has single side platform serving one track for trains of both directions.

Stations next to Shimokoma

History 
Station numbering was introduced in March 2018 with Shimokoma being assigned station number JR-H21.

References

External links

Official Website

Railway stations in Kyoto Prefecture
Railway stations in Japan opened in 1952